The 2023 Pacific Four Series is the third edition of the rugby union tournament and one of the principal qualification routes for the top two tiers of WXV. Spain, Australia and Canada have been confirmed as hosts for 2023.

The series will take place over three months. The first round will see Canada and the United States play the opening match in Madrid on 1 April. The second round will then see Australia host New Zealand in late June. The series will conclude in Canada with all four teams competing over two weekends in early July for the right to be crowned 2023 champions.

Format 
There will be six matches played over three months in a round-robin format.

Table

Fixtures

Round 1

Round 2

Round 3

Round 4

References 

2023
2023 rugby union tournaments for national teams
2023 in women's rugby union
2023 in American rugby union
2023 in Australian rugby union
2023 in Canadian rugby union
2023 in New Zealand rugby union
2023 in American women's sports
2023 in Spanish women's sport
2022–23 in Spanish rugby union